Márcio Gonçalves Bentes de Souza (born March 4, 1946) is a Brazilian journalist and writer, recognized for his focus on the Amazon basin.

Biography
Márcio was born in Manaus, Amazonas.

As a young man, in Manaus, he began working as a film critic in the newspaper O Trabalhista, of which his father is a partner. In 1965, he took over the coordination of the editions of the government of the State of Amazonas, but soon afterwards he moved to São Paulo and entered the social sciences course at the University of São Paulo (USP). Pursued by the military dictatorship, he interrupted his studies in 1969 and began his professional life in cinema, as a critic, scriptwriter and director. In the dramaturgy, he wrote pieces like "As folias do látex" and "Tem piranha no pirarucu".

With the work "Galvez – Imperador do Acre", he began his literary career in 1976. He wrote several works inserted in the socio-cultural environment of the Amazon, such as Mad Maria, Plácido de Castro contra o Bolivian Syndicate, Zona Franca, meu amor, Silvino Santos: o cineasta do ciclo da borracha, among others.

Between 1981 and 1982 He published in novels, in the newspaper Folha de S. Paulo, the novel A Resistível Ascensão do Boto Tucuxi.

He also stood out as a filmmaker and essayist (A selva; A expressão amazonense do neolítico à sociedade de consumo). More recently, it has been dedicated to a tetralogy about the years in which the former Província do Grão-Pará, which throughout the colonial period was a State separate from the State of Brazil, went through the serious crisis of its annexation to Brazil And of revolts against the power of Rio de Janeiro and/or against social inequality, of which blacks and Native Brazilians were particularly affected.

Fiction
Galvez – Imperador do Acre (1976)
Operação Silêncio (1978)
Mad Maria (1980)
A Resistível Ascensão do Boto Tucuxi (1982)
A Ordem do Dia (1983)
A Condolência (1984)
O Brasileiro Voador (1985) – a biography of Alberto Santos-Dumont
O Fim do Terceiro Mundo (1989)
A Caligrafia de Deus (1993)
Tetralogy: Crônicas do Grão-Pará and Rio Negro
Lealdade (1997)
Desordem (2001)
Revolta (2005)
Derrota (200?)

Theatre
Teatro Completo I
Teatro Completo II
Teatro Completo III

Essay
Mostrador de Sombras (1969)
A Expressão Amazonense (1977)
O Empate Contra Chico Mendes (1986)
Breve História da Amazônia (1992)
Anavilhanas, O Jardim do Rio Negro (1996)

References

1946 births
Living people
People from Manaus]
Brazilian people of Portuguese descent
Brazilian Jews
Brazilian writers
Brazilian science fiction writers